Moral ascendancy is the influence one individual or group of individuals may hold over others through his perceived morals and character. In law and order, commanding officers require this moral force to be able to exert control over those they lead. In military situations, this moral ascendancy can extend to "I am the better army...I dominate you by my morale, training, capability". Militarily moral ascendancy then is something to be gained and retained to achieve supremacy against the enemy.

See also 

 Moral high ground
 Moral hierarchy
 Science of morality
 Moral psychology
List of military strategies and concepts

References

Further reading 

 

Military strategy
Morality